Faridpur railway station is located in Faridpur District of Dhaka division, Bangladesh. It is a railway station located at Lakshmipur in Faridpur.

History
Faridpur Railway Station was built in 1899. This section from Rajbari to Faridpur was closed in 1997 on the pretext of losses. The construction was completed in 2014. After 17 years, the train service started again in 2014.

Services
Only Rajbari Express and Madhumati Express pass through this station.

References

External link 
 

Railway stations in Faridpur District
Railway stations opened in 1899
1899 establishments in British India